Rajoa Sadat is a town and Union Council of Chiniot District, Punjab, Pakistan. The town is situated near Faisalabad Sargodha Road. The shrine of Peer Shah Daulat, Brother of Peer Shah Jeewna is also situated here.

Rajoa Sadat has a name in the tent pegging society of Pakistan as several riders from the town enter in the competitions.

Demography 
The population according to the 2012 Census of Pakistan was 35318

References 

Populated places in Chiniot District